is a Japanese politician, who used to be a member of the Liberal Democratic Party (LDP) and who has served as a member of the House of Representatives in the Diet (national legislature). A native of Tokorozawa, Saitama and graduate of Saitama University, he had served in the assembly of Tokorozawa for three terms since 1979 and in the assembly of Saitama Prefecture for two terms since 1991. He was elected to the House of Representatives for the first time in 1996 as a member of the New Frontier Party. After losing his seat in 2000, he also lost the election in 2003. He was re-elected in 2005 as a member of the LDP.

References

External links 
  in Japanese.

1949 births
Living people
Politicians from Saitama Prefecture
Members of the House of Representatives (Japan)
New Frontier Party (Japan) politicians
20th-century Japanese politicians
Liberal Democratic Party (Japan) politicians
Saitama University alumni
21st-century Japanese politicians